Trebiidae is a family of copepods belonging to the order Siphonostomatoida.

Genera:
 Trebius Krøyer, 1837

References

Copepods